Clyde  is a city in Sandusky County, Ohio, located eight miles southeast of Fremont. The population was 6,325 at the time of the 2010 census. The National Arbor Day Foundation has designated Clyde as a Tree City USA.

The town is known for having served as inspiration for the setting of Sherwood Anderson's 1919 collection of short stories Winesburg, Ohio.

History
In the 1700s, the area of Ohio including present-day Clyde was inhabited by the Wyandot tribe. The distinction of first settler of Clyde goes to Jesse Benton. Claims that the first settler was Samuel Pogue are not entirely wrong as sometime during the war of 1812, Pogue drove a stake near the spring in the west part of Clyde with the intention of settling there after the war concluded. When Pogue returned in 1820 to take formal possession of the land, he found Jesse Benton had already built a cabin on the land. Shortly after Pogues arrival, Benton ceded his claim of the land to Pogue for a barrel of whiskey. Pogue lived in the Benton cabin until his death in 1828.

Clyde was named after Clyde, New York.

Early in the 20th Century, Clyde joined the automobile revolution, hosting the pioneering brass era company, Elmore Manufacturing Company. Elmore was taken over by General Motors in 1909 and operations were moved to Detroit in 1919. However, Louis Krebs resigned from Elmore when General Motors took over and formed his own company which later became the Clydesdale Motor Truck Company. After General Motors moved out, Krebs acquired their site in Clyde for his own operations. The buildings, by this time owned by Clyde Porcelain Steel, burned down November 11, 1945.

The Whirlpool Corporation purchased the Clyde Porcelain Steel Co. in 1952 and began producing washing machines there and then purchased the adjacent property of the Bendix Corporation in 1954, that produced belt-driven washing machines, making it the sole producer of washing machines in the area for the next six decades.

Geography
Clyde is located at  (41.304912, -82.976529).

Demographics

2020 Census 
According to the 2020 United States Census, the population of Clyde, Ohio was 6,922. The racial makeup of the city was 96.1% White, 1.2% African American, 0.3% Native American, 0.3% Asian, 0.3% from other races, and 1.8% from two or more races. Hispanic or Latino of any race were 1.2% of the population.

The median income for a household in the city was $50,865 and the median income for a family was $61,944. Males had a median income of $46,932 versus $30,917 for females. The per capita income for the city was $24,902. About 3.2% of families and 4.5% of the population were below the poverty line, including 4.7% of those under age 18 and 5.4% of those age 65 or over.

2010 census
As of the census of 2010, there were 6,325 people, 2,484 households, and 1,687 families living in the city. The racial makeup of the city was 94.4% White, 0.6% African American, 0.3% Native American, 0.4% Asian, 1.5% from other races, and 2.7% from two or more races. Hispanic or Latino of any race were 5.9% of the population.

There were 2,484 households, of which 35.5% had children under the age of 18 living with them, 47.0% were married couples living together, 14.7% had a female householder with no husband present, 6.3% had a male householder with no wife present, and 32.1% were non-families. 26.8% of all households were made up of individuals, and 12.2% had someone living alone who was 65 years of age or older. The average household size was 2.50 and the average family size was 2.99.

The median age in the city was 37.4 years. 26.3% of residents were under the age of 18; 8.1% were between the ages of 18 and 24; 25.7% were from 25 to 44; 26.1% were from 45 to 64; and 13.8% were 65 years of age or older. The gender makeup of the city was 48.7% male and 51.3% female.

2000 census
As of the census of 2000, there were 6,064 people, 2,304 households, and 1,633 families living in the city. The population density was 1,381.5 people per square mile (533.3/km2). There were 2,471 housing units at an average density of 563.0 per square mile (217.3/km2). The racial makeup of the city was 96.04% White, 0.15% African American, 0.12% Native American, 0.26% Asian, 0.03% Pacific Islander, 2.21% from other races, and 1.19% from two or more races. Hispanic or Latino of any race were 4.70% of the population.

There were 2,304 households, out of which 35.0% had children under the age of 18 living with them, 53.9% were married couples living together, 12.4% had a female householder with no husband present, and 29.1% were non-families. 24.4% of all households were made up of individuals, and 9.5% had someone living alone who was 65 years of age or older. The average household size was 2.59 and the average family size was 3.07.

In the city the population was spread out, with 27.0% under the age of 18, 8.7% from 18 to 24, 29.3% from 25 to 44, 22.2% from 45 to 64, and 12.8% who were 65 years of age or older. The median age was 35 years. For every 100 females, there were 91.7 males. For every 100 females age 18 and over, there were 89.4 males.

The median income for a household in the city was $39,764, and the median income for a family was $45,646. Males had a median income of $32,189 versus $23,549 for females. The per capita income for the city was $17,966. About 6.8% of families and 8.6% of the population were below the poverty line, including 11.4% of those under age 18 and 7.9% of those age 65 or over.

Education
Clyde is served by the Clyde-Green Springs school district. The nickname for Clyde's school sports teams is the Clyde Fliers, with the mascot being a jet plane sporting the school colors (Gold and royal blue).

Schools
 Clyde High School (Grades 9–12)
 Clyde Elementary School (Grades K-4)
 Green Springs Elementary (Grades K-5)
 McPherson Middle School (Grades 6–8)
 Harvest Temple Christian Academy (Grades K-12, Preschool, day care)

Economy
Clyde is the home of a Whirlpool Corporation plant.

Media
Clyde was served in print by the weekly newspaper The Clyde Enterprise for nearly 138 years, until its closure by Civitas Media in 2016.

Clean Air Radio Network, a Christian radio network broadcasting in Clyde, Findlay, and Coshocton, is owned and operated by Harvest Temple Christian Academy in Clyde.

The town was the setting for the 1990 film Welcome Home, Roxy Carmichael starring Winona Ryder.

Notable people
 Sherwood Anderson, author
 Tim Anderson, professional football player
Allie Luse Dick, music teacher
 Thaddeus B. Hurd, local historian
 James B. McPherson, Union major general
 George W. Norris, United States senator from Nebraska
 Rodger Young, Medal of Honor recipient and World War II veteran

References

External links

City website

 
Cities in Sandusky County, Ohio
Cities in Ohio